The 2008 World Junior Ice Hockey Championship Division III was an international ice hockey tournament, the fourth level of the 2008 World Junior Ice Hockey Championships. It was played from 16 to 24 January 2008 in Belgrade, Serbia.

Venue

Final standings

Results
All times are local.

See also
 2008 World Junior Ice Hockey Championships
 2008 World Junior Ice Hockey Championships – Division I
 2008 World Junior Ice Hockey Championships – Division II

References

External links 
 IIHF official website

III
World Junior Ice Hockey Championships – Division III
International ice hockey competitions hosted by Serbia
World